Tom Richmond is an American politician and a former Republican member of the Montana Senate, where he represented District 28, including parts of Billings, Montana.

References

Living people
Politicians from Billings, Montana
21st-century American politicians
Republican Party Montana state senators
Year of birth missing (living people)